Ilseng is a village in Innlandet county, Norway. The village is located mostly in Stange Municipality, however, part of the village extends across the border into Hamar Municipality. The Rørosbanen railway line passes through the village, stopping at the Ilseng Station which is the first stop after Hamar Station in Hamar. Ilseng is also the site of Ilseng Prison.

References

Stange
Hamar
Villages in Innlandet